The Syria women's national basketball team is the nationally controlled basketball team representing Syria at world basketball competitions for women, administered by the Syrian Basketball Federation.

Syria played in one Asian championships, taking ninth place in 1986 ABC Championship for Women.

Competition record

Summer Olympics

World Championships

Asian championship

West Asian Championship
{| class="wikitable" style="text-align: center;font-size:90%;"
!width=125|Year
!width=150|Position
!width=35|Pld
!width=35|W
!width=35|L
|-bgcolor=silver 
| 2019||Runners-up||4||2||2
|-
!Total||||4||2||2
|}

 Asian Games

yet to qualify

Mediterranean Games

 Syria's team came third in 1987 Mediterranean Games which was hosted in Latakia, Syria.

 At the 2013 Mediterranean Games the women's basketball tournament was cancelled because too few teams applied for the competition which was mainly due to coinciding dates with EuroBasket 2013.

Arab Championship

Pan Arab Games

Current squad
Current roster for the 2021 FIBA Women's Asia Cup Division B.

Notable players
 SWBL Multiple Champion'''
 Jehan Mamlouk – 8 titles

Kit

Sponsor
2021 – present: Cham Wings

See also
 Syria women's national under-18 basketball team
 Syria women's national under-17 basketball team
 Syria women's national 3x3 team

References

External links
Official website 
Syrian Basketball Federation website

 
Women's national basketball teams